Drop (formerly Massdrop) is an American e-commerce company based in San Francisco, California. 

Drop uses data and insights from community to develop and find products that feed their interests in audio products and mechanical keyboards. The Drop community can also learn, share, shop with others, and participate in product development through polls, discussions, and interest checks.

History
Drop founders Steve El-Hage and Nelson Wu met in Toronto, Canada, where El-Hage was studying economics at the University of Toronto. The two had grown up using online forums as a way to explore their hobbies, but believed these forums had many shortcomings, including disorganized meetups and unreliable group buys. They thought that by combining their forum experience with their interest in bulk buying, they could create a site that would better support enthusiast communities. The pair moved to Silicon Valley, where they started Massdrop in 2012.

Drop changed its name from Massdrop in April 2019.

Business model
Initially, Drop sold products exclusively from existing manufacturers. Intending to provide a collaborative environment, users were able to purchase as a group and influence the types of products sold, through participation in polls, community discussions, and posts. 

The company has since introduced exclusive enthusiast targeted private label products under the Drop name.

Past Drop products
Past products include the Massdrop x Sennheiser HD 6XX headphones, Massdrop x Sennheiser HD 58X headphones, Massdrop CTRL Mechanical Keyboard, Massdrop x Sennheiser PC37X gaming headset, Massdrop x Koss ESP/95X, among others.

Funding
In September 2014, Drop raised $6.5 million in a Series A round led by Mayfield Fund with additional investment from previous backers Kleiner Perkins Caufield & Byers, First Round Capital, and Cowboy Ventures. In August 2015, the company secured $40 million in Series B funding led by August Capital with additional investment from Mayfield Fund, First Round Capital, and Cowboy Ventures.

References

External links
 
 Drop on Facebook
 Drop on Twitter

Online retailers of the United States